Kizha (Kheje) is a rural locality (a station) in Zaigrayevsky District, Republic of Buryatia, Russia. The population was 84 as of 2010. There are 4 streets.

References 

Rural localities in Zaigrayevsky District